Long Hill, Connecticut may refer to:

Long Hill, Groton, Connecticut
Long Hill, Trumbull, Connecticut
The Long Hill neighborhood of the city of Waterbury

See also
Long Hill (disambiguation)